IL-22 or IL 22 can refer to:
 Interleukin 22
 Illinois's 22nd congressional district, an obsolete district
 Illinois Route 22
 Ilyushin Il-22, a Russian jet bomber aircraft
 Ilyushin Il-22, the airborne command post version of the Russian turboprop airliner Ilyushin Il-18